Regis or Régis is a given name. Notable persons with that given name include:

 Régis (footballer, born 1965), full name Reginaldo Paes Leme Ferreira, Brazilian footballer
 Régis Amarante Lima de Quadros (born 1976), Brazilian association football player
 Regis J. Armstrong, American Roman Catholic priest and professor
 Régis Avila (born 1962), Brazilian fencer
 Régis Barailla (1933–2016), French politician
 Régis Blachère, French orientalist
 Régis Bonissent (born 1948), French fencer
 Régis Boyer (1932–2017), French scholar
 Regis Brodie (born 1942), American Professor of Art and potter
 Régis Brouard (born 1967), French association football player
 Régis Campo (born 1968), French composer
 Regis Canevin (1853–1927), American Roman Catholic prelate
 Regis Chakabva (born 1987), Zimbabwean cricketer
 Régis Clère (born 1956), French road bicycle racer
 Regis Cordic (1926–1999), American radio personality and actor
 Régis Debray (born 1941), French intellectual, journalist and politician
 Régis Delépine (born 1946), French road bicycle racer
 Régis Dericquebourg (born 1947), French sociologist 
 Régis de l'Estourbeillon (1858–1946), French aristocrat and politician 
 Régis de Oliveira (born 1944), Brazilian politician
 Regis de Souza (born 1982), Brazilian association footballer
 Régis de Trobriand (1816–1897), French aristocrat, lawyer, poet and novelist
 Régis Dorn (born 1979), French association football player
 Regis Felisberto Masarim (born 1973), Brazilian football player
 Regis Fernandes Silva (born 1976), Brazilian association football player
 Régis Fuchs (born 1970), Swiss ice hockey winger
 Régis Genaux (1973–2008), Belgian association football player
 Régis Ghesquière (born 1949), Belgian decathlete
 Regis Ghezelbash (born 1951), Iranian-French film director
 Régis Gurtner (born 1986), French association football player
 Régis François Gignoux (1816–1882), French painter
 Régis Gizavo, Malagasy accordionist
 Regis Gurtner (born 1986), French football goalkeeper
 Régis Jauffret, French writer
 Régis Jolivet (1891–1966), French philosopher and Roman Catholic priest
 Régis Juanico (born 1972), member of the National Assembly of France
 Regis B. Kelly, Scottish neuroscientist and university administrator
 Regis "Pep" Kelly (1914–1990), Canadian ice hockey player
 Régis Kittler (born 1979), French football player
 Régis Koundjia (born 1983), former Central African Republic basketball player
 Régis Labeaume (born 1956), Canadian businessman and writer
 Régis Laconi (born 1975), French motorcycle racer
 Régis Laguesse (born 1950), French association football player and coach
 Régis Laspalès (born 1957), French comedian and actor
 Régis Le Sommier (born 1969), French journalist
 Regis Leheny (1908–1976), American baseball pitcher
 Régis Loisel (born 1951), French comics writer and artist
 Regis Malady (1917–1985), American politician from Pennsylvania
 Regis McKenna, American marketing entrepreneur
 Régis Messac (1893–1945), French writer
 Regis Monahan (1908–1979), American football player
 Regis Philbin (1931–2020), American television personality
 Regis Pitbull (born 1976), Brazilian association football player
 Regis Henri Post (1870–1944), New York politician and Governor of Puerto Rico
 Régis Racine (born 1970), French basketball player
 Régis Rey (born 1929), French ski jumper
 Régis Rothenbühler (born 1970), Swiss association football player
 Régis Schleicher (born 1957), French anarchist
 Régis Sénac, French fencer and instructor
 Régis Simon (born 1958), French road bicycle racer
 Victor Maria Regis "Vico" Sotto (born 1989), Filipino politician
 Regis Deon Thomas (born 1970), American convicted murderer on death row in California
 Regis Toomey (1898–1991), American actor
 Régis Wargnier (born 1948), French film director, producer, screenwriter, actor and film score composer

See also
 Regis (disambiguation)

Masculine given names